Steve Rhodes (born December 26, 1957) is a former NFL player for the St. Louis Cardinals. He is a former American football wide receiver. In 1981, Rhodes was drafted by the Saint Louis Cardinals out of the University of Oklahoma in the fourth round of the 1981 NFL Draft. He was a graduate of H. Grady Spruce in Dallas, Texas in 1976.

College: Oklahoma

Year	Round	Pick Overall	Player name	Position	NFL team

1981 	4 	#88 	Steve Rhodes 	WR 	St. Louis Cardinals

See also 
1981 NFL Draft

External links
 Team Draftees

1957 births
Living people
American football wide receivers
Oklahoma Sooners football players
Players of American football from Dallas